Sweet Oblivion is the sixth studio album by Screaming Trees, released on September 8, 1992. It quickly became the band's best-selling record, and was the closest they ever came to achieving mainstream success. Sweet Oblivion sold in excess of  300,000 copies on the strength of “Nearly Lost You”. The band's biggest hit, “Nearly Lost You” benefited from an appearance on Singles: Original Motion Picture Soundtrack, a Top Ten, platinum-selling hit album which featured many other popular Seattle-based music acts from the period.

Around the time of the recording of the album, the band’s original drummer Mark Pickerel left to pursue other musical interests, and was replaced with Barrett Martin.

Nearly four years passed in between Sweet Oblivion and the band's follow-up album, Dust, a move that hurt much of the band's commercial momentum.

Track listing

Personnel 

Screaming Trees
 Mark Lanegan – vocals
 Gary Lee Conner – guitar
 Van Conner – bass
 Barrett Martin – drums

Technical
 Don Fleming – production
 Andy Wallace – mixing
 Howie Weinberg – mastering
 John Agnello – engineering

Visual
 David Coleman – art direction
 Michael Lavine – photography

Charts

References

External links 
Amazon.com Listing

Screaming Trees albums
1992 albums
Epic Records albums
Albums produced by Don Fleming (musician)